Kirkman House may refer to:

in Canada
Kirkman House, Arnprior, a historic house, now a bed and breakfast

in the United States
Kirkman House (Walla Walla, Washington), a house museum
O. Arthur Kirkman House and Outbuildings, High Point, North Carolina, National Register of Historic Places listings in Guilford County, North Carolina
Kirkman Ale House, Orlando, Florida
Kirkman House (Kirkman, Iowa), the first house in the town of Kirkman, Iowa